ALisher Yusupov (born 2 December 1998) is an Uzbekistani judoka.

He is the bronze medallist of the 2019 Judo Grand Slam Osaka in the +100 kg category.

References

External links
 
 
 

Living people
1998 births
Uzbekistani male judoka
20th-century Uzbekistani people
21st-century Uzbekistani people